Remley Point Cemetery (also known as Scanlonville Cemetery) is a cemetery located in the Scanlonville community in Mt. Pleasant, South Carolina. It contains 41 marked graves ranging from 1867 to 1989, but residents claim there may be over 1,000 people, largely African American, buried there. It was added to the National Register of Historic Places in 2p02.

In 1999, the 3-acre cemetery was purchased by Tom and Victoria Rogers, who planned to use the property as part of a larger homestead. In 2001, the Rogers filed to relocate the graves so that they could build their home, but withdrew the request when residents of Scanlonville sued to block the relocation. Following a renewal of that request, in 2005 a judge ruled that the historical cemetery could not be developed.

References

National Register of Historic Places in Charleston County, South Carolina
Cemeteries on the National Register of Historic Places in South Carolina
Mount Pleasant, South Carolina
1867 establishments in South Carolina